The Carmen Mountain shrew (Sorex milleri) is a species of mammal in the family Soricidae. It is endemic to Mexico.

References

Endemic mammals of Mexico
Sorex
Mammals described in 1947
Taxonomy articles created by Polbot
Fauna of the Sierra Madre Oriental